The High Huts of the White Mountains are eight mountain huts in the White Mountains of New Hampshire, owned and maintained by the Appalachian Mountain Club. They are modeled after similar huts in the Alps and positioned at intervals along the Appalachian Trail, allowing "thru-hikers" who hike the entire Appalachian Trail to benefit from their services. They are generally separated by six to eight miles, about a day's hike.

Hikers can reserve overnight bunks at the huts, which hold from 36 to 96 people each. They offer full service from June through mid-September, serving dinner and breakfast. Three huts stay open the rest of the year as self service, allowing guests to cook their own food in the kitchen.

The huts are staffed by a team of five to nine caretakers—often called "the croo"—during full-service season. Each crew member works eleven days on, three days off.  During the eleven working days, they must make four trips back down the mountain to get food and other supplies, carrying heavy loads. At the beginning of each season, fuel and supplies are flown into the huts by helicopter. The huts were built and are maintained by the Appalachian Mountain Club's construction crew. 

The huts have handled thousands of hikers entering the back woods and environmentally sensitive areas above tree line. Four years and an environmental impact statement were required to get the huts' permits renewed by the U.S. Forest Service in 1999.

The winter huts closed in March 2020 and the other huts did not open for the summer 2020 season due to the COVID-19 pandemic. This was the first time that all huts have been closed at once. The huts re-opened on June 26, 2020, for daytime visits only.

Hut history
The following High Huts are presented in the order they would be reached when hiking the Appalachian Trail from south to north.

Lonesome Lake
Lonesome Lake Hut is the second lowest hut in the system. It started out in 1876 as a fishing camp on Lonesome Lake, with cabins built by author W.C. Prime. The hut officially became part of the AMC system in 1929, when the State of New Hampshire bought the land and invited the club to run it as a shelter.

Greenleaf
Greenleaf Hut lies on a prominent shoulder of Mount Lafayette, with views of Franconia Ridge. Its construction was the first to leave behind the stone and masonry construction technique utilized by earlier huts, and to use a team of mules to carry materials. It was completed in 1930 and pioneered running water and indoor toilets, reflecting an evolution of AMC huts from simple shelters towards becoming more like mountainside hostels. Much of Greenleaf's construction funding came from Colonel Charles Greenleaf, for whom it is named. It features a central dining room and kitchen flanked by two bunkrooms, a design which became the model for Galehead and Zealand Falls huts, both constructed within the next year.

Galehead
Construction on the original structure there began in 1931, using wood from the surrounding trees. It was completed in 1932, along with Zealand Falls Hut, its closest northern neighbor. A small space under the front porch was used to store perishable foods. In 1938, Galehead gained a temporary 360 degree view when the Great New England Hurricane blew over all the surrounding trees. Given its altitude and remoteness, the vast majority of the new structure's materials had to be carried in; thus mainly lightweight materials were utilized.

Zealand Falls
Zealand Falls Hut was completed in 1932 along with Galehead and has been open in the winter season since 1973. It, like Lonesome Lake hut, is notable as a "family" hut due to its low altitude and relatively easy approach climb. It also has the lowest capacity of all the huts, sleeping little more than a third of the largest capacity hut.

Mizpah Spring

Mizpah Spring Hut was originally built in 1964, and although there are newer buildings in the system, this makes Mizpah the newest hut site in the system. The building is designed to withstand  winds and was built with materials brought in by helicopter.

Lakes of the Clouds

Lakes of the Clouds Hut is the highest and largest hut in the system. It was built as a shelter in 1901 in response to the deaths of two hikers the previous year who were caught in a storm on their way to an AMC meeting atop Mount Washington. It was rebuilt as a hut in 1915, and was renovated in 1922, 1927, 1947, 1969, and 2005. It is located adjacent to its namesake Lakes of the Clouds, two small alpine tarns, and just below the  summit of Mount Monroe. The hut provides bunks for 90 hikers. It is sometimes called "Lakes of the Crowds" due to its size and popularity.

Madison Spring

Madison Spring Hut, originally built in 1888, is the oldest hut site in the United States. The first overnight guests stayed in the winter of 1889, and in 1906 a fee of 50 cents per night was instituted to utilize the shelter. The original hut was expanded in that same year, as well as 1911, 1922, and 1929. However, in 1940, a fire—caused by the ignition of gasoline for the gasoline-electric power generator—destroyed much of the hut. The following year it was rebuilt and re-opened. The hut was extensively rehabilitated in the fall of 2010 and early 2011. 

The hut is accessed most directly from the Valley Way trail (from the Appalachia parking lot). It is generally considered the most difficult of the full-service huts to access, based on distance and elevation required to reach it.

Carter Notch
Carter Notch Hut is the easternmost hut in the system and is open year-round. Between 1996 and 2006, it operated on a self-service basis; since then it has resumed operating as a full-service hut during the summer season, remaining self-service the rest of the year. The site's use as a shelter began in 1904 as a simple log cabin; the building was rebuilt as a hut in 1914, making Carter Notch the oldest building in the hut chain, supposedly by Milton McGregor, aka "Red Mac".  There are two bunkhouses located a short distance from the main hut structure; thus from the cliffs above, the hut is viewed as a small compound. There are two small ponds located nearby, as well as a tremendous boulder field.  Carter Notch helped establish the hut as a viable pursuit for the AMC, and after its initial success, the group began to lay plans for a hut system.

Table

References

External links
 Map of hut locations along the AT
 Current Hiking Conditions near the AMC Huts
 Article about hut system's history as a whole
 A map of the hut system (south<->north)

Mountain huts in the United States
White Mountain National Forest
Buildings and structures in New Hampshire
Appalachian Mountain Club